Sandip Tanpan Banerjee (born 20 December 1983 in Agartala, Tripura) is an Indian first-class cricketer who plays for Tripura.

References

External links
 

1983 births
Living people
Indian cricketers
Tripura cricketers
Cricketers from Tripura
People from Agartala